Prairie Pals is a 1942 American Western film directed by Sam Newfield.

Cast 
Art Davis as Deputy Marshal Art Davis
Bill 'Cowboy Rambler' Boyd as Deputy Marshal Bill Boyd
Lee Powell as Marshal Lee Powell
Esther Estrella as Betty Wainwright
Charles King as Henchman Mitchell
John Merton as Henchman Ed Blair
Jack Holmes as Mr. Wainwright
Kermit Maynard as Henchman Crandall
I. Stanford Jolley as Ace Shannon

Soundtrack 
Bill "Cowboy Rambler" Boyd and Art Davis - "I Wish I Knew The Way You Feel" (Written by Johnny Lange and Lew Porter)

External links 

1942 films
American black-and-white films
1942 Western (genre) films
Films directed by Sam Newfield
Producers Releasing Corporation films
American Western (genre) films
1940s English-language films
1940s American films